Tear Gas is the fourth studio album by American rapper The Jacka. It was released on June 16, 2009 through The Artist Records/SMC Recordings. Recording sessions took place at 17 Hertz Studios in Hayward and at Skyblaze Studios in Emeryville. Production was handled by MG, Roblow, Bedrock, Traxamillion, Cellski, Jeffro, Joe Millionaire, Kareem K, Lee Bannon, Lee Majors, Stagmata and The Inkredibles, with The Jacka serving as executive producer. It features guest appearances from Ampichino, Andre Nickatina, AP.9, Cellski, Cormega, Devin the Dude, Dubb 20, E-40, Freeway, J. Stalin, Jynx, Krondon, Masspike Miles, Matt Blaque, Mistah F.A.B., Mitchy Slick, Paul Wall, Phil da Agony, Planet Asia, Rydah J. Klyde, Sky Balla and Zion I. The album debuted at number 93 on the US Billboard 200, with 5,800 copies sold in its first week of release.

The album had two singles: "Glamorous Lifestyle" with Andre Nickatina and "All Over Me" with Matt Blaque. An additional video was also made for the Freeway-assisted track "They Dont Know".

Track listing

Personnel
DJ Impereal – scratches (track 15)
James Ward – mixing (tracks: 1, 4, 5, 7-13, 15-18)
M.G. The Producer – mixing (tracks: 1, 8, 15, 18)
Sultan "Traxamillion" Banks – mixing (tracks: 2, 9)
Michael Denten – mixing (tracks: 3, 6), mastering
"G-Man" Stan Keith – mixing (tracks: 14, 19)
Joseph "Bedrock" Epperson – mixing (track 14)
Sam Gamble – recording
Dominick "The Jacka" Newton – executive producer
"The Original" Photo Doctor Graphics – art direction, design, photography

Charts

References

External links

Thebayisback.com

2009 albums
The Jacka albums
SMC Recordings albums
Albums produced by Fred Warmsley
Albums produced by the Inkredibles